Womanhood is the state of being a woman.

Womanhood may also refer to:

Womanhood (album), a 1978 album by Tammy Wynette
"Womanhood" (song), the title track of the album